We Never Learn is a Japanese manga series written and illustrated by Taishi Tsutsui. It was launched in the 10th issue of Shueisha's Weekly Shōnen Jump magazine on February 6, 2017. Viz Media announced their license of the manga for English release in North America in April 2017, and serialized it digitally in their Weekly Shonen Jump magazine.



Volumes

References

We Never Learn